Godfrey Mwakikagile (born 4 October 1949 in Kigoma) is a prominent Tanzanian scholar and author specialising in African studies. He was also a news reporter for The Standard (later renamed the Daily News) — the oldest and largest English newspaper in Tanzania and one of the three largest in East Africa.

Mwakikagile wrote Nyerere and Africa: End of an Era — a biographical book on the life of former Tanzanian President Julius Nyerere set in the backdrop of Africa's early post-colonial years and the liberation wars in the countries of southern Africa in which Nyerere played a major role.

Growing up in the 1950s, Mwakikagile experienced a form of apartheid and racial segregation in Tanganyika, what is now mainland Tanzania, and wrote about it in some of his works, as he did about the political climate of Tanganyika during the colonial era. As Trevor Grundy, a British journalist who worked at The Standard, later Daily News, during the same years Mwakikagile did, stated in his review – “Julius Nyerere Reconsidered” –  of Professor Thomas Molony's book, Nyerere: The Early Years,  on africaunauthorised.com, 4 May 2015, the British turned Tanganyika into an undeclared apartheid state that was socially divided between divided Africans, Europeans and Asians. It was British-style apartheid. Their secret was never to give racial segregation a name.

Early life and family
Mwakikagile was born on 4 October 1949 into a middle class Tanganyikan family in the town of Kigoma, Western Province of Tanganyika – what is now mainland Tanzania. His father Elijah Mwakikagile, who once worked at the Amani Research Institute in the late forties, was a medical assistant during the British colonial era and was one of the few in the entire country of 10 million people. There were fewer than 300 medical assistants and fewer than 10 doctors in Tanganyika in the forties and fifties and only 12 doctors at independence from the United Kingdom on 9 December 1961. Medical assistants underwent an intensive three-year training after finishing secondary school and worked as a substitute for doctors. Godfrey's mother Syabumi Mwakikagile (née Mwambapa), a housewife, was a pupil of Tanganyika's British feminist educator, and later member of parliament, Mary Hancock, who taught her at Kyimbila Girls' School in Rungwe District in  the Southern Highlands Province in the early 1940s. Mary Hancock was a friend of Nyerere and his family since 1953 and supported him during the struggle for independence.

The eldest of his siblings, Mwakikagile was named Godfrey by his aunt Isabella, one of his father's younger sisters, and was baptised at an early age.

His father played a critical role in his early life and education. He was a strict disciplinarian and taught him at home when he was attending primary school from Standard One to Standard Four and during the first two years of middle school, Standard Five and Standard Six, before he left home to go to boarding school in 1963, three miles away, when he was 13 years old. He also taught him when he was out of school and went home during holidays in his last two years of middle school in Standard Seven and Standard Eight. His mother, who taught Sunday school and was a volunteer adult education teacher for some time teaching adults how to read and write, also taught him at home when he was in primary school.

His father was also active in the Tanganyika African National Union – TANU – which led the struggle for independence and was friends with some of the leading figures in the African independence movement. They included John Mwakangale, his classmate from Standard One at Tukuyu Primary School to Malangali Secondary School in the Southern Highlands Province. They came from the same area, five miles apart, in Rungwe District and knew each other since childhood. Mwakangale became  one of the prominent leaders of the Tanganyika African National Union and of  the Pan-African Freedom Movement of East and Central Africa (PAFMECA), later renamed the Pan-African Freedom Movement of East, Central and Southern Africa (PAFMECSA), formed to campaign for the independence of the countries of East and Central Africa and later Southern Africa.  He also became a Member of Parliament (MP) and  a cabinet member in the early part of independence under Nyerere.  Mwakangale was also the first leader Nelson Mandela met in newly independent Tanganyika in January 1962 –  just one month after Tanganyika emerged from colonial rule – when Mandela secretly left South Africa on 11 January to seek assistance from other African countries in the struggle against apartheid and wrote about him in his autobiography Long Walk to Freedom. 

Others were  Austin Shaba, Elijah Mwakikagile's co-worker as a medical assistant and earlier his classmate at the Medical Training Centre (MTC) at Tanganyika's largest hospital in the capital Dar es Salaam later transformed into the country's first medical school who served as a Member of Parliament  and cabinet member in the first independence cabinet— serving as Minister of Local Government and later as Minister of Health and Housing, and as Deputy Speaker of Parliament; Wilbard B.K. Mwanjisi, his classmate from Standard One at Tukuyu Primary School to Malangali Secondary School who became a doctor, prominent member of TANU and, before leaving government service, was president of the Tanganyika Government Servants Association, a national organisation for African government employees during colonial rule; and Jeremiah Kasambala, Elijah Mwakikagile's classmate at Malangali Secondary School who became head of the Rungwe African Cooperative Union responsible for mobilising support from farmers to join the struggle for independence and who went on to become a cabinet member in the early years of independence—taking over the portfolio for Commerce and Cooperatives and later serving as Minister of Industries, Minerals and Energy.

Elijah Mwakikagile was also a first cousin of one of Tanzania's first commercial airline pilots, Oscar Mwamwaja, who was shot but survived when he was a co-pilot of an Air Tanzania plane, a Boeing 737, that was hijacked on 26 February 1982 and forced to fly from Tanzania to Britain. His mother was an elder sister of Oscar's father. And his son Godfrey is a first cousin of Brigadier-General Owen Rhodfrey Mwambapa, a graduate of Sandhurst, a royal military academy in the United Kingdom, and head of the Tanzania Military Academy, an army officers' training school at Monduli in Arusha Region. Owen's father was an elder brother of Godfrey's mother.

Education and early employment
Godfrey Mwakikagile attended Kyimbila Primary School - founded by British feminist educator Mary Hancock and transformed into a co-educational institution - near the town of Tukuyu, and Mpuguso Middle School in Rungwe District, Mbeya Region, in the Southern Highlands. The headmaster of Mpuguso Middle School, Moses Mwakibete, was his math teacher in 1961 who later became a judge at the High Court of Tanzania appointed by President Nyerere. And One of his American Peace Corps teachers at Mpuguso Middle School in 1964 was Leonard Levitt  who became a prominent journalist and renowned author. He wrote, among other works, An African Season, the first book ever written by a member of the Peace Corps, and Conviction: Solving the Moxley Murder, about a homicide which received extensive media coverage because it involved a member of the Kennedy family. Mwakikagile also attended Songea Secondary School from 1965 to 1968 in Ruvuma Region which was once a part of the Southern Province. His current affairs teacher at Songea Secondary School, Julius Mwasanyagi, was one of the early members and leaders of TANU (Tanganyika African National Union) who played a major role in the struggle for independence and worked closely with Nyerere. And his headmaster at Songea Secondary School, Paul Mhaiki, was later appointed by President Nyerere as Director of Adult Education at the Ministry of National Education and after that worked for the United Nations (UN) as Director of UNESCO's Division of Literacy, Adult Education, and Rural Development. After finishing his studies at Songea Secondary School in Form IV (Standard 12) in 1968, Mwakikagile went to Tambaza High School in 1969 in Dar es Salaam, formerly H.H. The Aga Khan High School mostly for Asian students (Indian and Pakistani), where he completed Form VI (Standard 14) in 1970. One of his classmates at Tambaza High School was Mohamed Chande Othman, simply known as Chande, who became Chief Justice of Tanzania appointed to the nation's highest court by President Jakaya Kikwete after serving as a high court judge and as a UN prosecutor for international criminal tribunals.

While still in high school at Tambaza, Mwakikagile joined the editorial staff of The Standard (later renamed the Daily News) in 1969 as a reporter. He was hired by the news editor, David Martin, a British journalist who later became Africa correspondent of a London newspaper, The Observer, the world's oldest Sunday paper, covered the Angolan Civil War for BBC and for CBC (Canadian Broadcasting Corporation) and was a close friend of President Nyerere. Mwakikagile credits David Martin for opening the door for him into the world of journalism and helping him launch his career as a news reporter when he was still a high school student. In addition to his position as news editor, David Martin also served as deputy managing editor of the Tanganyika Standard.  Founded in 1930, The Standard was the oldest and largest English newspaper in the country and one of the three largest in East Africa, a region comprising Kenya, Uganda and Tanzania.

After finishing high school in November 1970, Mwakikagile joined the National Service in January 1971 which was mandatory for all those who had completed secondary school, high school and college or university studies. He underwent training, which included basic military training, at Ruvu National Service camp when it was headed by his former primary school teacher Eslie Mwakyambiki before he became a Member of Parliament and Deputy Minister of Defence and National Service under President Nyerere. Mwakikagile then went to another National Service camp in Bukoba on the shores of Lake Victoria in the North-West Region bordering Uganda.

After leaving National Service, Mwakikagile returned to the Daily News. His editor then was Sammy Mdee who later served as President Nyerere's press secretary and as Tanzania's deputy ambassador to the United Nations and as ambassador to France and Portugal, and then Benjamin Mkapa who helped him to further his studies in the United States. Years later, Mkapa became President of Tanzania after serving as President Nyerere's press secretary, Minister of Foreign Affairs and as ambassador to Nigeria, Canada and the United States among other cabinet and ambassadorial posts. He was a student of Nyerere in secondary school at St. Francis College, Pugu, on the outskirts of Dar es Salaam, and president of Tanzania for 10 years, serving two consecutive five-year terms.

Mwakikagile also worked as an information officer at the Ministry of Information and Broadcasting (now known as the Ministry of Information, Youth, Culture and Sports) in Dar es Salaam. He left Tanzania in November 1972 to go for further studies in the United States when he was a reporter at the Daily News under Mkapa. He has stated in some of his writings including Nyerere and Africa: End of an Era that without Mkapa, he may never have gone to school in the United States where he became an author and an Africanist focusing on post-colonial studies.

One of Mwakikagile's main books in post-colonial studies is The Modern African State: Quest for Transformation (Nova Science Publishers, Inc., Huntington, New York, 2001). Professor Guy Martin, in his book African Political Thought (Palgrave Macmillan, 2012) in which he examines the political thought of leading African political thinkers throughout history dating back to ancient times (Kush/Nubia, sixth century BCE), has described Mwakikagile as one of Africa's leading populist scholars and political thinkers and has used his book The Modern African State to examine his ideas. Professor Edmond J. Keller, Chairman of the Political Science Department at the University of California-Los Angeles (UCLA), in his review of Professor Martin's African Political Thought in  Africa Today, Volume 60, Number 2, Winter 2013, Indiana University Press, has described Mwakikagile as a public intellectual and an academic theorist. Professor Ryan Ronnenberg in his article about Mwakikagile in the Dictionary of African Biography, Volume 6 (Oxford University Press, 2011) covering the lives and legacies of notable African men and women since ancient times, edited by Harvard University professors, Emmanuel K. Akyeampong and Henry Louis Gates Jr., has stated that Mwakikagile has written major works of scholarship which have had a great impact in the area of African studies.

Some of Mwakikagile's most influential books in post-colonial studies include Africa and the West, reviewed by West Africa magazine, and Africa After Independence: Realities of Nationhood. Professor Ronnenberg has used both books and others by Mwakikagile in his article about him in the Dictionary of African Biography to explain  his ideas and influence.

Mwakikagile's books are found in college and university libraries throughout the world. They are also found in public libraries. They are primarily for scholars.

Mwakikagile's works in post-colonial studies have been cited in other contexts besides academic fields. The premier of Western Cape Province in South Africa, Helen Zille, in her speech in the provincial parliament on 28 March 2017, cited Godfrey Mwakikagile's analysis of the impact of colonial rule on Africa in defence of her Tweets which her critics said were a defence of colonialism and even called for her resignation. She said her analysis was the same as Mwakikagile's and those of other prominent people including Nelson Mandela, Chinua Achebe, Ali Mazrui, and former Indian prime minister, Manmohan Singh, stating that she made the same point they did. And South African Vice President Phumzile Mlambo-Ngcuka in her speech on African leadership and development  at a conference of African leaders, diplomats and scholars at the University of the Western Cape in South Africa in September 2006 cited Mwakikagile from his book Nyerere and Africa: End of an Era to support her position on the subject.

In the United States, Mwakikagile served as president of the African Students Union whilst attending Wayne State University in Detroit, Michigan. He graduated from that university in 1975. 
 
After completing his studies at Wayne State, Mwakikagile went to Aquinas College in Grand Rapids, Michigan, in 1976. One of his professors of economics and head of the economics department at Aquinas was Kenneth Marin who once worked as an economic advisor to the government of Tanzania in Dar es Salaam on capital mobilisation and utilisation from the late 1960s to the early 1970s. Before he went to Tanzania, Professor Marin was a member of the White House Consumer Advisory Council where he served on Wage and Price Control in the mid-1960s, appointed by President Lyndon B. Johnson.

Books
Mwakikagile's first book, Economic Development in Africa, was published in June 1999. He has written more than 70 books in 20 years, mostly about Africa during the post-colonial era. He has written about history, politics, economics, as well as contemporary and international affairs from an African and a Third World perspective.

He takes an interdisciplinary approach in his works combining history, political science, economics, philosophy, cultural and international studies and other academic disciplines in his analysis of a wide range of issues focusing on Africa, especially during the post-colonial era. His books are used in various academic disciplines up to the post-graduate level including doctoral studies. He has also written some books about the African diaspora, mainly Black America and the Afro-Caribbean region including Afro-Caribbean communities in Britain and the United States. His books on race relations include Shattered Dream: Race and Justice, Patrick Lyoya killed by the police: What did I do wrong?, Across The Colour Line in an American City, On the Banks of a River, In the Crucible of Identity and Reflections on Race Relations: A Personal Odyssey which is a comparative analysis between colonial Tanganyika and the United States in terms of race relations that also focuses on problems in race relations in the American context in contemporary times.

Nyerere and Africa: End of an Era

His book Nyerere and Africa: End of an Era, was published not long after Nyerere died. Through this book, Mwakikagile is an authority on Nyerere and one of his most prominent biographers. Professor David Simon, a specialist in development studies at the University of London and Director of the Centre for Development Areas Research at Royal Holloway College, published in 2005 excerpts from the book in his compiled study, Fifty Key Thinkers on Development. Mwakikagile's book was reviewed by West Africa magazine in 2002. It was also reviewed by a prominent Tanzanian journalist and political analyst, Fumbuka Ng'wanakilala of the Daily News, Dar es Salaam, in October 2002, and is seen as a comprehensive work, in scope and depth, on Nyerere. The same book was also reviewed by Professor Roger Southall of the University of the Witwatersrand (Wits), formerly of Rhodes University, South Africa, in the bi-annual interdisciplinary publication, the Journal of Contemporary African Studies (Taylor & Francis Group), 22, No. 3, in 2004. Professor Southall was also the editor of the journal during that period.

Others who reviewed the book include Professor A.B. Assensoh, a Ghanaian teaching at Indiana University in Bloomington, Indiana, in the United States. He reviewed the first edition of Nyerere and Africa: End of an Era in the African Studies Review, an academic journal of the African Studies Association, in 2003.

Controversy
Mwakikagile has been criticised, along with some African and European scholars including Professor Ali Mazrui, Christoph Blocher, Mahmood Mamdani, Peter Niggli, and R. W. Johnson, as someone who advocates the recolonisation of Africa through supervision of failed states by the United Nations.

Academic reviews
Mwakikagile's books have been reviewed in a number of academic publications, including the academic journal African Studies Review, by scholars in their fields. They include Military Coups in West Africa Since The Sixties, which was reviewed in that journal by Professor Claude E. Welch of the Department of Political Science at the State University of New York, Buffalo; and Ethnic Politics in Kenya and Nigeria, reviewed by Nigerian Professor Khadijat K. Rashid of Gallaudet University, Washington, D.C.

Other books by Mwakikagile have also been reviewed in the African Studies Review and in the Journal of Contemporary African Studies, including Nyerere and Africa: End of an Era and The Modern African State: Quest for Transformation which were reviewed in the African Studies Review. Nyerere and Africa was also reviewed in the Journal of Contemporary African Studies.

His book, Western Involvement in Nkrumah's Downfall, was reviewed by Professor E. Ofori Bekoe,  in Africa Today, Vol. 64, Number 4, Summer 2016, Indiana University Press.

Mwakikagile has also written about race relations in the United States and relations between continental Africans and people of African descent in the diaspora in his titles such as Black Conservatives in The United States; Relations Between Africans and African Americans; and Relations Between Africans, African Americans and Afro-Caribbeans. Professor Kwame Essien of Gettysburg College, later Lehigh University, a Ghanaian, reviewed Relations Between Africans and African Americans: Misconceptions, Myths and Realities, in Souls: A Critical Journal of Black Politics, Culture, and Society, Volume 13, Issue 2, 2011, an academic journal of Columbia University, New York, and described it as an "insightful and voluminous" work covering a wide range of subjects from a historical and contemporary perspective, addressing some of the most controversial issues in relations between the two.

References

</div>

Selected bibliography

Economic Development in Africa, Huntington, New York: Nova Science Publishers, Inc. June 1999
Africa and The West, Huntington, New York: Nova Science Publishers, Inc. 2000
The Modern African State: Quest for Transformation, Huntington, New York: Nova Science Publishers, Inc., 2001
Military Coups in West Africa Since The Sixties, Huntington, New York: Nova Science Publishers, Inc., 2001
Ethnic Politics in Kenya and Nigeria, Huntington, New York: Nova Science Publishers, Inc. 2001
Nyerere and Africa: End of an Era, Protea Publishing Co., Atlanta, Georgia, USA, 2002
Africa is in A Mess: What Went Wrong and What Should Be Done (2004), Dar es Salaam, Tanzania: New Africa Press, 2006
Tanzania under Mwalimu Nyerere: Reflections on an African Statesman, 2006
Black Conservatives: Are They Right or Wrong?, 2004
Nyerere and Africa: End of an Era: Expanded Edition with Photos, 2005
Relations Between Africans and African Americans: Misconceptions, Myths and Realities, 2007
Life in Tanganyika in The Fifties: My Reflections and Narratives from The White Settler Community and Others, 2006
Life in Tanganyika in The Fifties, 2009
African Countries: An Introduction, Continental Press, Johannesburg, South Africa, 2006
African Countries: An Introduction, 2009
Africa After Independence: Realities of Nationhood, Dar es Salaam, Tanzania: New Africa Press, 2006
Life under Nyerere, 2006
Black Conservatives in The United States,  2006
Africa and America in The Sixties: A Decade That Changed The Nation and The Destiny of A Continent, 2006
Relations Between Africans, African Americans and Afro-Caribbeans: Tensions, Indifference and Harmony, 2007
Investment Opportunities and Private Sector Growth in Africa, 2007
Kenya: Identity of A Nation, 2007
South Africa in Contemporary Times, 2008
South Africa and Its People, 2008
African Immigrants in South Africa, 2008
The Union of Tanganyika and Zanzibar: Product of The Cold War?, 2008
Ethnicity and National Identity in Uganda: The Land and Its People, 2009
My Life as an African: Autobiographical Writings, 2009
Uganda: The Land and Its People,, 2009
Botswana Since Independence, 2009
Congo in The Sixties, 2009
A Profile of African Countries, 2009
Africans and African Americans: Complex Relations – Prospects and Challenges,,  2009
Africa 1960 – 1970: Chronicle and Analysis, Dar es Salaam, Tanzania: New Africa Press, 2009
Nyerere and Africa: End of an Era, 5th Edition, Pretoria, South Africa: New Africa Press, 2010
Zambia: Life in an African Country, 2010
Belize and Its Identity: A Multicultural Perspective, 2010
Ethnic Diversity and Integration in The Gambia: The Land, The People and The Culture, 2010
Zambia: The Land and Its People, 2010
Belize and Its People: Life in A Multicultural Society, 2010
The Gambia and Its People: Ethnic Identities and Cultural Integration in Africa, 2010
South Africa as a Multi-Ethnic Society, 2010
Life in Kenya: The Land and The People, Modern and Traditional Ways, 2010
Botswana: Profile of A Nation, 2010
Uganda: Cultures and Customs and National Identity,, 2011
Burundi: The Hutu and The Tutsi: Cauldron of Conflict and Quest for Dynamic Compromise, 2012
Identity Politics and Ethnic Conflicts in Rwanda and Burundi: A Comparative Study, 2012
The People of Uganda: A Social Perspective, 2012
Uganda: A Nation in Transition: Post-colonial Analysis, 2012
Obote to Museveni: Political Transformation in Uganda Since Independence, 2012
Uganda Since The Seventies, 2012
Civil Wars in Rwanda and Burundi: Conflict Resolution in Africa, 2013
Peace and Stability in Rwanda and Burundi: The Road Not Taken, 2013
Africa at the End of the Twentieth Century: What Lies Ahead, 2013
Statecraft and Nation Building in Africa: A Post-colonial Study, 2014
Africa in The Sixties, 2014
Remembering The Sixties: A Look at Africa, 2014
Restructuring The African State and Quest for Regional Integration: New Approaches, 2014
Africa 1960 – 1970: Chronicle and Analysis, Revised Edition, 2014
Post-colonial Africa: A General Study, 2014
British Honduras to Belize: Transformation of a Nation, 2014
Why Tanganyika united with Zanzibar to form Tanzania, 2014
Congo in The Sixties, Revised Edition, 2014
The People of Kenya and Uganda, 2014
Namibia: Conquest to Independence: Formation of a Nation, 2015
Western Involvement in Nkrumah's Downfall, 2015
Africa: Dawn of a New Era, 2015
The Union of Tanganyika and Zanzibar: Formation of Tanzania and its Challenges, 2016
The People of Ghana: Ethnic Diversity and National Unity, 2017
Africa in Transition: Witness to Change, 2018
The African Liberation Struggle: Reflections, 2018
Life under British Colonial Rule: Recollections of an African and a British Administrator in Tanganyika and Southern Rhodesia, 2018
Conquest of the Mind: Imperial subjugation of Africa, 2019
Colonial Mentality and the Destiny of Africa, 2020
Across The Colour Line in an American City, 2020
On the Banks of a River, 2020
In the Crucible o Identity, 2020
Reflections on Race Relations: A Personal Odyssey, 2021
Growing up in a Border District and Resolving the Tanzania-Malawi Lake Dispute: Compromise and concessions, 2022
Patrick Lyoya killed by the police: What did I do wrong?, 2022
Shattered Dream: Race and Justice, 2023

External link
Godfrey Mwakikagile: Eurocentric Africanist?

1949 births
Living people
Tanzanian Africanists
People from Kigoma Region
Tanzanian non-fiction writers
Aquinas College (Michigan) alumni
Wayne State University alumni
Tanzanian journalists